, also known as  for short, is a Japanese manga series written and illustrated by Morohe Yoshida, which were serialized in Kadokawa Shoten's Young Ace magazine from August 2010 to May 2015. An anime television adaptation by Production IMS aired in Japan between January and March 2014.

Plot
Clumsy, with average intellect, and incredibly shy - these are some of the characteristics that middle schooler Inari Fushimi possesses. Despite her always getting into trouble, she is always optimistic and considerate of others. When someone needs help, she really can't ignore them. She also has a crush on Kouji Tanbabashi, who she always admires for being cheerful and extremely hardworking. But she couldn't bring herself to expose her feelings as her shyness kept getting in her way.

Inari, KonKon, Koi Iroha, begins with Inari taking a shortcut to school. On her way, she sees a fox pup who is about to fall into a river. Despite being late, she jumps into the river and manages to save the little fox pup from being washed away. Uka-no-Mitama-no-Kami, the goddess of the Inari Shrine is extremely thankful for Inari's kindness towards the little pup, who turns out to be a familiar named Kon. As a token of her gratitude, she fulfills one of Inari's wishes. But the fulfillment of the wish only invites trouble and Inari soon finds herself in a pinch. To compensate for her mistake, Uka-no-Mitama-no-Kami bestows a small part of her divine power to Inari, giving her the ability to transform into anyone at will.

Inari now possesses the power of a god, even if its just a small amount. Soon, various otherworldly beings start taking an interest in her, for the better or worse. What kinds of adventure awaits Inari? And will she able to tell Koji everything that she kept in her heart for a very long time?

Characters

Main characters
  

Inari is the main protagonist of the series, and a middle school student. After saving a fox spirit from getting washed away in the river, she was granted with the power to change shape at will by uttering the phrase "Inari, Konkon", ("Konkon" seems to refer to the sound that foxes were thought to made). Later, it is hinted strongly that the power she received isn't just the power to change shape; she has also unconsciously used the divine power to make her hopes come true. After a series of events, during which she returns Uka's powers but develops her own, Inari has entered new god training so that she can control her divine power and live with it as a human. Outside of the gods, only Tōka and Kōji are aware of Inari's powers and her relationship with the gods. She is a kind, clumsy girl who cares deeply for her friends and wants to help anyone anyway she can. She begins to realize her powers can't always solve her problems and learns to accept herself for who she is. She confesses to Kouji in chapter 38, and after he accepts the two begin going out. By the end of the manga, she is still human, a high school student with short hair, still dating Kouji, while Uka and Touka watch over her from above.
Her name is a reference to Fushimi-Inari Station. She also got ridiculed during her childhood because she had the same name as Fushimi Inari-taisha
  

Usually simply called "Uka". After granting a wish by Inari to become someone else, which she came to regret, Uka gave Inari some of her power so that she may transform at will. Despite being a god, she has great interest with otaku stuff and is usually seen playing games in her room or in Tōka's room. This was due to Miya introducing her to video games when she brought Uka a video game as a souvenir. She enjoys watching over humans and begins to desire wanting to be human especially because of her friendship with Inari and feelings for Touka. She prefers spending time on earth because many Gods in the heavens wish to marry her but only want to marry her for her rank not her personality. She appears to have developed feelings for Tōka, much to the disdain of her fellow gods and her mother. As Inari begins to use the divine power Uka gave to her, Uka starts to disappear as Inari begins to inadvertently absorb the divine power, almost making her a God. Eventually Inari learns of this and returns the power but develops divine powers of her own, causing Inari to slowly lose her humanity as she becomes a god while Uka starts becoming human. Touka accidentally confesses to her in chapter 40 and she reciprocates and by the end of the manga she is still a God and with Touka who became a God to be with her and has a child with him while watching over Inari from above.

Humans
  

A classmate of Inari's, whom she has a crush on, and is on the basketball team. He is a hard worker and very polite and kind. Prior to getting to know Inari, he appeared to have a crush on Sumizome, though this is soon revealed to be false. However, he soon develops feelings for Inari. He has since come to terms that he does like Inari, even going so far as to tell his closest male friends of his growing feelings. He lives with his mother and his younger brother. His father died in a car accident, leaving him to decide to become independent and help his mother around the house. His feelings for Inari stem from the fact that he was happy that someone recognized his efforts and saw him for who he was, along with the fact that despite how clumsy she is, she puts her all to helping others. He eventually comes to learn about Inari's powers. He realizes he loves her in chapter 17, and episode 7 of the anime. She confesses to him in chapter 38 and he happily accepts. His mother eventually brings home a man she loves and plans to marry. But, Koji has a hard time coming to terms with this because it feels as if his mother is denying the existence of his father and by that, an extension of himself. Eventually, he realizes the man she chose cares for her and her children. After seeing his father's spirit in chapter 50, Koji comes to terms with his father's death. In the last chapter, he is seen in high school still happily dating Inari.
His name is a reference to Tambabashi Station.
  

Inari's classmate, described as being extremely pretty and very popular with the boys. She loves school and homework and is usually a kind, polite person who thinks of others especially her friends. However, she has a surprisingly ferocious temper, especially when wanting to protect her friends. Her parents are often shown as busy, and her father is a transvestite, making life for her difficult as she has no one to talk to, and has to rely on herself. Originally an outcast due to her looks, Akemi has developed a close friendly bond with Inari. She develops feelings for Keiko, but chooses to cover it since she thinks people will see her weirdly as love between a girl and girl is strange. After some encouragement from her friends, she eventually decides to accept her own feelings. While Sanjou rejects her, the two still remain friends.
Her name is a reference to Sumizome Station.
  

Inari's older brother, who is a high school student. He appears to get relatively high grades, and begin developing feelings for Uka. He has been able to see gods since he was young. Due to an event that occurred at Uka's shrine, he was initially very mistrustful of her. It is revealed Uka once transformed herself into a human to help him off the mountain. He is handsome, but a recluse who spends his time away from others and keeps to himself, frequently studying to get into a good university and also has a strange poem blog post. He is also short-tempered and childish, frequently being referred to having eighth-grade syndrome, despite being in his last year of high school. He also tends to get lost easily. He is protective of Inari and initially apprehensive of Uka, believing she has malicious intents for Inari, but realizes she is a good person and befriends her, even letting her come over to play games with him (though at first she came on her own accord). Eventually his grades drop over time as he spends time with Uka and wonders about his future and relationship with her, during this time he begins to wear glasses. Despite his developing feelings for Uka, he is having doubts because he realizes he is gradually growing farther away from her. He accidentally confesses to her in Chapter 40, and by the end of the manga, is shown to have become a God to be with Uka and has a child with her, while watching over Inari from above.
  

One of Inari's best friends and a very boyish girl who feels protective of her friends. She has known Inari since elementary school and cares for her tremendously. She learns of Akemi's feelings for her after eavesdropping on her turning down another boy, and has since become conflicted on how to respond. While she does reject Akemi, she continues to be her friend.
Her name is a reference to Sanjō Station.
  

One of Inari's best friends and a fujoshi, known as Maru for short. She has trouble opening up to others due to her unique tastes, but is befriended by Inari and becomes friends with Keiko and Akemi too.
Her name is a reference to Jingū-Marutamachi Station.
 

Kōji's little brother, who eventually gets to know and like Kon. He is shown to be rather sensitive, as he got mad at seeing other kids having a father in the manga. Though so, he is actually cute and appears to respect both his brother and mother.

A girl who also has a crush on Kōji. Not much is told about her, except the fact that she herself given her feelings up and wanted to support Tanbabashi's feeling.

Minami's best friend.

Gods
  

Uka's familiar, who Inari saved from falling into a river. She is the smallest of the familiars, and was assigned to Inari according to her personality match. She can manifest herself to humans as a young fox-tailed girl wearing a hooded fox sweater. Kōji's younger brother, Shirō, appears to like her. In the end of the manga, she is shown to have grown up properly and could change into human's shape without fox ears and tail.
  
 
Uka's familiars who are older than Kon. They often stay close by Uka, who tends to have them transform into games consoles.
 
 
 The head goddess of the sun who watches over Inari, making sure she can control her powers. She is the God of Sun who keep the sun shone everyday on human's world. She used to complain about it, but it's later shown that she actually got some day-offs, like on Winter season. First appearing to be rude and to hate humans, she actually did care for humans.
 

Known as "Toshi" for short. Uka's older brother who has an incredible sister complex, which has disturbed Uka to the point where she has banned him from entering the Inari shrine. Despite claiming to have a wife, he frequently flirts with other women openly.
 

One of the five pillar gods, known as "Miya" for short. She is shown to be much younger than Uka, probably around Inari's age. She is friendly and caring, as shown in both the manga and anime.
 

 Uka's mother.
 

 Uka's father and Amaterasu's brother, who sports a notable pompadour.

Media

Manga
Inari, Konkon, Koi Iroha, written and illustrated by Morohe Yoshida, began serialization in the August 2010 issue of Kadokawa Shoten's Young Ace. The first tankōbon volume was published on March 31, 2011, and finished with ten volumes in May 2015. A spin-off four-panel comic strip manga titled , written by Yoshida and illustrated by Nanatsu Mukunoki, was serialized in Kadokawa Shoten's 4-Koma Nano Ace between the May and October 2013 issues.

Anime
An anime television series adaptation, directed by Toru Takahashi and produced by Production IMS, aired in Japan between January 15, 2014 and March 19, 2014, and was simulcast by Funimation. An original video animation episode was released on June 26, 2014. The anime's episode 10 features an insert song sung by Naomi Ōzora under her character name Inari Fushimi titled . Kadokawa Entertainment also released the series on Blu-ray on March 28, 2014.

Episode list

References

External links
 Inari, Konkon, Koi Iroha at Kadokawa Shoten 
 Anime official website 
 

2010 manga
2014 anime television series debuts
Anime series based on manga
Funimation
Kadokawa Dwango franchises
Kadokawa Shoten manga
Production IMS
Romantic comedy anime and manga
Seinen manga
Shinto in fiction